LaTarence Dunbar (born August 15, 1980) is a former elite sprinter and NFL wide receiver.

Early life
Dunbar grew up in Dallas, Texas and graduated in 1998 from South Oak Cliff High School.

While in high school, he starred at wide receiver and also finished among the top 5 in the state in both the 100 meter high hurdles (14.34 seconds) and the 300 meter high hurdles (36.43 seconds).

He was then recruited to play football and run track at TCU.

College athletics
After a red shirt year and a year as a back-up, Dunlap started for three years as a wide receiver  for TCU.

While playing football at TCU, Dunbar also ran track, winning the 60 meter high hurdles at the 2002 Southwest Track Invitational. As noted on the Conference USA website, "the victory for Dunbar was a bit of a surprise, as the TCU football standout practiced for just two days before taking the track on Saturday." Dunbar later set the school record in that event (running the 60 meter high hurdles in 7.88 seconds); it was a school record not broken for 14 years.

NFL career
Dunbar was drafted by the Atlanta Falcons in the 6th round of the 2003 NFL Draft. He played for the Falcons for two seasons and was then traded to the Houston Texans , where he played in 2005.

After sports
Since his NFL career, Dunbar has dedicated his time in local communities by helping the city of Dallas unite with his nonprofit school, CCWOA.

References

1980 births
Living people
American football wide receivers
TCU Horned Frogs football players
Atlanta Falcons players
Houston Texans players